Şilyan is a village and municipality in the Kurdamir District of Azerbaijan. The municipality consists of the villages of Şilyan and Qarasu.

References 

Populated places in Kurdamir District